The Terwilliger House is a historic home located on Myers Road in the Town of Shawangunk, Ulster County, New York, United States. It was built between about 1766 and 1800, and is a two-story, five bay, Federal frame dwelling on a stone foundation.  It has a one-story kitchen addition.

It was added to the National Register of Historic Places in 1983.

References

Houses on the National Register of Historic Places in New York (state)
Houses in Ulster County, New York
National Register of Historic Places in Ulster County, New York
Shawangunk, New York
Federal architecture in New York (state)